"Gone" is a song by Dutch DJ and music producer Afrojack featuring American singer Ty Dolla $ign. It was released on 5 August 2016.

Music video
The music video was published on 6 October 2016. It involves Ty Dolla $ign talking to Afrojack on the phone about making a record and how Afrojack can't do it. Ty then goes to a party and socializes with the women in and around the pool.

Charts

Weekly charts

Year-end charts

References

2016 singles
Afrojack songs
Ty Dolla Sign songs
2016 songs
Songs written by Ty Dolla Sign
Songs written by Marty James
Songs written by Afrojack